The Hope Dealer, Pt. 1 is the debut studio album by American rapper EDIDON of Outlawz. It was released on December 4, 2015, through O4L Digital. It features guest appearances from Aktual, Devapink, C-Bo, June Summers, Nutt-So, Kastro, Freddie Gibbs, Krayzie Bone, Young Noble, Planet Asia, Translee, Dyson, Mistah F.A.B., Bad Lucc, Ras Kass, Gangsta Boo, Mitchy Slick, DJ Stay Turnt Up, Deladiea, James Wade, Kokane and Kurupt.

Track listing

References

External links 
 O-4-L.com Official EDIDON's Website
 
 
 

2015 albums
E.D.I. albums
Albums produced by E.D.I.